Mohamed Rahem, (born June 21, 1970 in Algiers) is a former Algerian international football player who played as a forward. He took part in two Africa Cup of Nations in 1990 when he was champion and in 1992.

Honours
Algerian Ligue 1
Runners-up (1) : 1991–92
Africa Cup of Nations
Champion (1) : 1990

External links
 

1970 births
Living people
Footballers from Algiers
Algerian footballers
Algerian expatriate footballers
Algeria international footballers
1990 African Cup of Nations players
1992 African Cup of Nations players
Competitors at the 1991 Mediterranean Games
USM El Harrach players
NA Hussein Dey players
Expatriate footballers in Morocco
Algerian expatriate sportspeople in Morocco
Africa Cup of Nations-winning players
Association football forwards
SCC Mohammédia players
Mediterranean Games competitors for Algeria
21st-century Algerian people